Andy Genzman (born December 5, 1960) is an American former stock car racing driver. He competed in thirteen NASCAR Craftsman Truck Series races in his career.

NASCAR career
Genzman debuted in 1996, running three races. In all of the three starts he made that year, Genzman finished in the top-20. After starting 28th, he finished 17th in his debut at Bristol. He was then 18th at Infineon and 20th at Mesa Marin.

Genzman would make two more races in 1997. He started 19th and finished 32nd at Evergreen, his worst career finish. He was able to improve somewhat when he returned to racing at ORP, finishing 21st.

Genzman returned to racing eight times in 2000. Although he only finished in the top-20 three times in the year, his worst finish was just 31st (which was the only race he did not finish). His best finish ended up being an 18th at Evergreen, closely followed by a 19th at Milwaukee. Genzman's 31st in points would prove to be his best career showing and he has not raced since then.

Motorsports career results

NASCAR
(key) (Bold – Pole position awarded by qualifying time. Italics – Pole position earned by points standings or practice time. * – Most laps led.)

Winston Cup Series

Craftsman Truck Series

External links

1960 births
American racing drivers
NASCAR drivers
Living people